Hercules was a Dutch 68-gun third-rate ship of the line of the navy of the Dutch Republic, the Batavian Republic, and the Royal Navy.

The order to construct the ship was given by the Admiralty of the Meuse in 1781.

In 1795, the ship was commissioned in the Batavian Navy.

On 11 October 1797 Hercules took part in the Battle of Camperdown under Captain G.J. van Rijsoort. Fire broke out on the ship, and she was eventually captured by the British and renamed HMS Delft, in honour of the brave resistance the ship Delft had made in the battle.

In 1799, Delft served as a troop transport ship. She became a prison hulk in 1802, and in 1822 she was sunk to serve as a breakwater close to the town of Harwich.

References

External links
 

Ships of the line of the Dutch Republic
Ships of the line of the Batavian Republic
Ships of the line of the Royal Navy
Ships built in the Netherlands
1782 ships
Maritime incidents in 1797
Ships sunk as breakwaters